Oreolalax puxiongensis (Puxiong toothed toad) is a species of amphibian in the family Megophryidae.
It is endemic to China where it is only known from two locations in Yuexi County, Sichuan, including Puxiong (普雄镇), its type locality.
It inhabits marshes, pools, small streams and the surrounding subtropical forest. It is threatened by habitat loss.

See also
 Puxiong salamander

References

puxiongensis
Endemic fauna of Sichuan
Amphibians of China
Taxonomy articles created by Polbot
Amphibians described in 1979
Endangered Fauna of China